Nowitka was a sternwheel steamboat that operated in British Columbia on the Columbia River from 1911 to May 1920.   The name is a Chinook Jargon word usually translated as "Indeed!" or "Verily!".

Design and construction

Nowitka was built at Golden, BC for the Golden Columbia River Lumber Company.  Nowitka'''s engines were over 70 years old, and had been originally built for a ferry crossing the St. Lawrence River.  The engines had been previously installed in other sternwheelers on the upper Columbia River, including the first Duchess, the second Duchess and Ptarmigan.  The blunt-ended bow of Nowitka allowed the vessel to be readily capable of pushing barges, which increased the vessel's utility and effective cargo capacity.Downs, Art, Paddlewheels on the Frontier -- The Story of British Columbia and Yukon Sternwheel Steamers, at 101-112, Superior Publishing, Seattle WA 1972

OperationsNowitka was placed on the Columbia River route that began at Golden and ran south, at least during high water, to Columbia Lake, the ultimate source of the Columbia River.  Nowitka was last used to haul supplies to construct a bridge at Brisco, BC.

Removal from service
Following construction of the bridge at Brisco, Nowitka was taken out of service in May 1920, and abandoned near the sawmill wharf at Golden.  Nowitka was the last steamboat to operate on the Columbia River in the Columbia Valley, although gasoline and diesel powered vessels did run later on the river.

Notes

Further reading

 Faber, Jim, Steamer's Wake—Voyaging down the old marine highways of Puget Sound, British Columbia, and the Columbia River, Enetai Press, Seattle, WA 1985 
 Timmen, Fritz, Blow for the Landing'', 75-78, 134, Caxton Printers, Caldwell, ID 1972 

Paddle steamers of British Columbia
Steamboats of the Columbia River
Columbia Valley
1911 ships